This is a list of 90 neighborhoods in the city of Pittsburgh, Pennsylvania, United States.  Generally neighborhood development followed ward boundaries, although the City Planning Commission has defined some neighborhood areas.  The map of neighborhoods presented here is based on the official designations from the City of Pittsburgh.

Neighborhoods

Allegheny Center
Allegheny West
Allentown
Arlington
Arlington Heights
Banksville
Bedford Dwellings
Beechview
Beltzhoover
Bloomfield
Bluff (also known as Uptown or Soho)
Bon Air
Brighton Heights
Brookline
California-Kirkbride
Carrick
Central Business District (also known as Downtown and the Golden Triangle)
Chinatown (historic)
Cultural District
Central Lawrenceville
Central Northside
Mexican War Streets
Central Oakland
Chartiers
Chateau
Crafton Heights
Crawford-Roberts
Duquesne Heights
East Allegheny (also known as Deutschtown)
East Carnegie
East Hills
East Liberty
Elliott
Esplen
Fairywood
Fineview
Friendship
Garfield
The Valley
Hilltop
Glen Hazel
Greenfield
Four Mile Run
Hays
Hazelwood
Highland Park
Homewood North
Homewood South
Homewood West
Knoxville
Larimer
Lincoln–Lemington–Belmar
Lincoln Place
Lower Lawrenceville
Manchester
Marshall-Shadeland (also known as Brightwood and Woods Run)
Brunot Island
Middle Hill
Morningside
Mount Oliver (not to be confused with the neighboring borough of Mount Oliver)
Mount Washington
Chatham Village
New Homestead
North Oakland
North Point Breeze
North Shore
Northview Heights
Oakwood
Overbrook
Perry North (also known as Observatory Hill)
Perry South (also known as Perry Hilltop)
Point Breeze
Park Place
Polish Hill
Regent Square
Ridgemont
Saint Clair
Shadyside
Sheraden
South Oakland
Panther Hollow
Southshore
Station Square
South Side Flats
SouthSide Works
South Side Slopes
Spring Garden
Spring Hill–City View
Squirrel Hill North
Squirrel Hill South
Summerset
Stanton Heights
Strip District
Summer Hill
Swisshelm Park
Duck Hollow
Terrace Village
Troy Hill
Washington's Landing
Upper Hill
Upper Lawrenceville
West End
West Oakland
Westwood
Windgap

Areas
 Central
 East End
 North Side
 South Side
 West End

List of municipalities annexed
 Pitt Township (part) in 1816
 Northern Liberties in 1837
 Lawrenceville in 1867
 Collins, Liberty, Oakland, Peebles and Pitt Twps. in 1868
 Allentown, Birmingham, East Birmingham, Monongahela, Mount Washington,  Ormsby, South Pittsburgh, St. Clair, Temperanceville, Union and West Pittsburgh in 1872
 Garfield in 1881
 Brushton in 1894
 Beltzhoover in 1898
 Esplen and Sterrett Twp. in 1906
 Allegheny in 1907, including formerly-annexed Manchester (1867) and Duquesne (part, 1868)
 Beechview and West Liberty in 1908
 Spring Garden in 1920
 Lower St. Clair Township in 1924
 Carrick, Knoxville, and Westwood in 1927
 Overbrook in 1930

See also
 History of Pittsburgh
 North Hills (Pennsylvania)
 Penn Hills, Pennsylvania
 Pittsburgh areas
 Pittsburgh metropolitan area communities
 South Hills (Pennsylvania)

References

 
Pittsburgh
Neighborhoods